Mete Binay (born 19 January 1985 in Emirseyit, Tokat) is a Turkish world champion weightlifter competing in the –69 kg division.

He won the bronze medal at the 2010 European Weightlifting Championships held in Minsk, Belarus, gold medal at the 2010 World Weightlifting Championships held in Antalya, Turkey and gold medal in snatch event at the 2011 World Weightlifting Championships held in Paris, France.

On 3 July 2020 the International Olympic Committee disqualified Binay from the 2012 Olympic Games, and struck his results from the record for failing a drugs test in a re-analysis of his doping sample from 2012.

Medals

World Championships

European Championships

References

External links
International Weightlifting Federation

1985 births
Living people
World Weightlifting Championships medalists
Sportspeople from Tokat
Turkish male weightlifters
Olympic weightlifters of Turkey
Weightlifters at the 2012 Summer Olympics
European Weightlifting Championships medalists
Doping cases in weightlifting
Turkish sportspeople in doping cases
21st-century Turkish people